Katlakunta is a village in Jagtial district, of Telangana.

References

Villages in Jagtial district